The 1983 St Albans City and District Council election took place on 5 May 1983 to elect members of St Albans City and District Council in England. This was on the same day as other local elections.

Summary

Ward results

Ashley

Batchwood

Clarence

Cunningham

Harpenden East

Harpenden North

Harpenden South

 
 

 

No Independent candidate as previous (7.3%).

Harpenden West

London Colney

Marshallwick North

 
 

 

No Independent candidate as previous (11.7%).

Marshallwick South

Park Street

Redbourn

Sandridge

Sopwell

St. Peters

St. Stephens

Verulam

Wheathampstead

 

 

No Alliance candidate as previous (42.3%).

References

St Albans
St Albans City and District Council elections
1980s in Hertfordshire